This is a list of the Sweden national football team results from 2000 to 2009.

2000

2001

2002

2003

2004

2005

2006

2007

2008

2009

See also
 Sweden national football team results (1908–1919)
 Sweden national football team results (1920–1939)
 Sweden national football team results (1940–1959)
 Sweden national football team results (1960–1979)
 Sweden national football team results (1980–1989)
 Sweden national football team results (1990–1999)
 Sweden national football team results (2000–2009)
 Sweden national football team results (2010–2019)
 Sweden national football team results (2020–present)

References

External links
Results at RSSSF 

2000s in Sweden
2000s
2000 in Swedish football
2001 in Swedish football
2002 in Swedish football
2003 in Swedish football
2004 in Swedish football
2005 in Swedish football
2006 in Swedish football
2007 in Swedish football
2008 in Swedish football
2009 in Swedish football